Corpulent Stump is a rocket designed and built by Richard Brown at Rocket Store and is the most powerful non commercial rocket ever launched on an Aerotech engine in the United Kingdom. The rocket weighs 50 kg and is designed to reach 500 mph and an altitude of 1,829 metres.

The rocket was launched on August 26, 2007, at the International Rocket Week event held near Largs, Ayrshire.

External links
Rocket Store Website
International Rocket Week
BBC news article
BBC news article
Evening Times news article

Rockets and missiles